The Papagayo are strong winds that blow north of the Gulf of Papagayo.

Papagayo may also refer to:

 Papagayo (software)
 Papagayo Peninsula, Costa Rica
 Papagayo River, Mexico
 Papagayos, a village in Chacabuco Department, San Luis Province, Argentina
 Castillo de Papagayo, the original name of Charco del Palo, a Canary Islands naturist village
 Gulf of Papagayo, Costa Rica

See also
 Papagaio (disambiguation)